Hugo Arthur Rundell Guinness (born 12 September 1959) is a British artist, illustrator, and writer. He is known for his illustrations in The New York Times and his bold, graphic black-and-white block prints, many of which have appeared in films and publications. He is perhaps best known for his collaborations with film director Wes Anderson.

Career and style
Guinness attended Eton College. Prior to turning to a career as an artist and writer, he served as a copywriter at the advertising agency Collett Dickenson Pearce, an investment banker with Guinness Mahon, and the founder of Coldpiece Pottery. 

Guinness depicts everyday and eclectic objects or phrases in a simplistic but humorous way. His works have appeared in publications including The New Yorker, The New York Times, and Vogue. Guinness has also designed apparel for clothing company Pussy Glamour and a range of leather goods for Coach New York. Guinness's works have been collected by people including magazine editor Anna Wintour, actor Heath Ledger, actresses Amanda Peet, Natalie Portman, and Michelle Williams, artist Jack Pierson, and most notably director Wes Anderson, with whom Guinness has collaborated on several films.

Film
Guinness's collaboration with Anderson includes artwork in the films The Royal Tenenbaums (2001) and The Life Aquatic with Steve Zissou (2004), and providing the voice of Nathan Bunce in Fantastic Mr. Fox (2009). Guinness worked with Anderson on the story for The Grand Budapest Hotel (2014), which garnered him a shared nomination for the Academy Award for Best Original Screenplay.

In 2015, Guinness created an animated short film for J Crew to raise awareness of ivory poaching.

Guinness also contributed to the BBC Storyville documentary Hi Society – The Wonderful World of Nicky Haslam.

Personal life
Guinness was born in London, the youngest child of five and only son of Pauline Vivien (née Mander) and James Edward Alexander Rundell Guinness, a banker and Royal Navy veteran. Guinness is a member of the branch of the Guinness family descended from Samuel Guinness, brother of Arthur Guinness. Among Guinness's siblings are the socialite Sabrina Guinness; Anita Guinness, wife of Amschel Rothschild; and philanthropist Julia Samuel.

Guinness lives in the Boerum Hill neighborhood of Brooklyn with his wife, the artist Elliott Puckette, whom he married in December 1996. They have two children, Isabella and Violet.

References

External links
 

Living people
1959 births
Hugo
Artists from London
Artists from New York (state)
People educated at Eton College
English screenwriters
English male screenwriters
Writers from London
English expatriates in the United States
Best Original Screenplay BAFTA Award winners